Matt Deggs (born August 20, 1971) is an American baseball coach and former infielder, who is the current head baseball coach for the Louisiana Ragin' Cajuns. He played college baseball at Alvin Community College (1991–1992) then transferred to Northwood University (1993–1994) before playing professional baseball for 3 season from 1995 to 1997. He then served as the head coach of the Sam Houston State Bearkats (2015–2019).

Playing career
Deggs played college baseball at Alvin Community College before transferring to Northwood University and a brief professional career with the Mobile BaySharks and the Tennessee Tomahawks for three years.

Coaching career
Deggs became an assistant coach at Northwestern State for two seasons. He completed his undergraduate degree at Northwestern State then became head coach at Texarkana. He then was a hitting and infield coach at Arkansas for 3 seasons, Texas A&M for six seasons during which he rose to become Associate Head Coach, and three seasons at Louisiana
before beginning at Sam Houston State. After 5 seasons at Sam Houston, Deggs was named head coach of the Louisiana Ragin Cajuns’ baseball team on July 17, 2019, following the death of longtime head coach, Tony Robichaux.

Head coaching record 
Below is a table of Deggs' Head Coaching years.

Personal life
Deggs is married to the former Kathy Saldua. They have four children; one son: Kyler, and two daughters: Klaire and Khloe.

See also
List of current NCAA Division I baseball coaches

References

Alvin Dolphins baseball players
Arkansas Razorbacks baseball coaches
Baseball infielders
Living people
Louisiana Ragin' Cajuns baseball coaches
Northwestern State Demons baseball coaches
Northwood Knights baseball players
Sam Houston Bearkats baseball coaches
Texarkana Bulldogs baseball coaches
Texas A&M Aggies baseball coaches
1971 births
Northwestern State University alumni
Mobile Baysharks players
Tennessee Tomahawks players